Miguel "Micky" López Rivera is a Puerto Rican politician and the current mayor of Las Piedras. López is affiliated with the New Progressive Party (PNP) and has served as mayor since 2009. Has Bachelor's degree in administration with concentration in accounting from the University of Puerto Rico at Humacao.

References

Living people
Mayors of places in Puerto Rico
New Progressive Party (Puerto Rico) politicians
People from Las Piedras, Puerto Rico
Year of birth missing (living people)